"Good King Wenceslas", (Roud number 24754) is a Christmas carol that tells a story of a Bohemian king who goes on a journey, braving harsh winter weather, to give alms to a poor peasant on the Feast of Stephen (December 26, the Second Day of Christmas). During the journey, his page is about to give up the struggle against the cold weather, but is enabled to continue by following the king's footprints, step for step, through the deep snow. The legend is based on the life of the historical Saint Wenceslaus I, Duke of Bohemia (907–935). 

In 1853, English hymnwriter John Mason Neale translated the lyric from a Czech poem by Václav Alois Svoboda, in collaboration with his music editor Thomas Helmore, and the carol first appeared in Carols for Christmas-Tide, published by Novello & Co the same year. Neale's lyric was set to the melody of the 13th-century spring carol "Tempus adest floridum" ("Eastertime Is Come") first published in the 1582 Finnish song collection Piae Cantiones.

Source legend
Wenceslas was considered a martyr and a saint immediately after his death in the 10th century, when a cult of Wenceslas rose up in Bohemia and in England. Within a few decades of Wenceslas's death, four biographies of him were in circulation. These hagiographies had a powerful influence on the High Middle Ages conceptualization of the rex iustus, or "righteous king"—that is, a monarch whose power stems mainly from his great piety, as well as from his princely vigor.

Referring approvingly to these hagiographies, a preacher from the 12th century wrote:

Several centuries later the legend was claimed as fact by Pope Pius II, who himself also walked ten miles barefoot in the ice and snow as an act of pious thanksgiving.

Although Wenceslas was, during his lifetime, only a duke, Holy Roman Emperor Otto I (962–973) posthumously "conferred on [Wenceslas] the regal dignity and title" and that is why, in the legend and song, he is referred to as a "king." The usual English spelling of Duke Wenceslas's name, Wenceslaus, is occasionally encountered in later textual variants of the carol, although it was not used by Neale in his version. Wenceslas is not to be confused with King Wenceslaus I of Bohemia (Wenceslaus I Premyslid), who lived more than three centuries later.

Authorship

Tempus adest floridum

The tune is that of "Tempus adest floridum" ("Eastertime has come"), a 13th-century spring carol in 76 76 Doubled Trochaic metre, first published in the Finnish song book Piae Cantiones in 1582. Piae Cantiones is a collection of seventy-four songs compiled by Jacobus Finno, the Protestant headmaster of Turku Cathedral School, and published by Theodoric Petri, a young Catholic printer. The book is a unique document of European songs intended not only for use in church, but also schools, thus making the collection a unique record of the late medieval period.

A text beginning substantially the same as the 1582 "Piae" version is also found in the German manuscript collection Carmina Burana as CB 142, where it is substantially more carnal; CB 142 has clerics and virgins playing the "game of Venus" (goddess of love) in the meadows, while in the Piae version they are praising the Lord from the bottom of their hearts. The tune has also been used for the Christmas hymn Mary Gently Laid Her Child, by Joseph S. Cook (1859–1933); GIA's hymnal, Worship uses "Tempus Adest Floridum" only for Cook's hymn.

Neale's carol

In 1853, English hymnwriter John Mason Neale wrote the "Wenceslas" lyric, in collaboration with his music editor Thomas Helmore, and the carol first appeared in Carols for Christmas-Tide, published by Novello & Co the same year.

The text of Neale's carol bears no relationship to the words of "Tempus Adest Floridum". In or around 1853, G. J. R. Gordon, the British envoy and minister in Stockholm, gave a rare copy of the 1582 edition of Piae Cantiones to Neale, who was Warden of Sackville College, East Grinstead, Sussex and to the Reverend Thomas Helmore (Vice-Principal of St. Mark's College, Chelsea).

The book was entirely unknown in England at that time. As a member of the Tractarian Oxford Movement, Neale was interested in restoring Catholic ceremony, saints days and music back into the Anglican church. The gift from G. J. R. Gordon gave him the opportunity to use medieval Catholic melodies for Anglican hymn writing.

In 1849 he had published Deeds of Faith: Stories for Children from Church History which recounted legends from Christian tradition in Romantic prose. One of the chapters told the legend of St Wenceslas and his footsteps melting the snow for his page:
"My liege," he said, "I cannot go on. The wind freezes my very blood. Pray you, let us return."
"Seems it so much?" asked the King. "Was not His journey from Heaven a wearier and a colder way than this?"
Otto answered not.
"Follow me on still," said S. Wenceslaus. "Only tread in my footsteps, and you will proceed more easily."
The servant knew that his master spoke not at random. He carefully looked for the footsteps of the King: he set his own feet in the print of his lord's feet.

For his 1853 publication Carols for Christmas-tide, he adapted his earlier prose story into a poem, and together with the music editor Thomas Helmore added the words to the melody in Piae Cantiones, adding a reference to Saint Stephen's Day (26 December), making it suitable for performance on that Saint's Day.

The hymn's lyrics take the form of five eight-line stanzas in four-stress lines. Each stanza has an ABABCDCD rhyme scheme. Lines 1, 3, 5, and 7 end in single-syllable (so-called masculine) rhymes, and lines 2, 4, 6, and 8 with two-syllable ("feminine") rhymes. (In the English tradition, two-syllable rhymes are generally associated with light or comic verse, which may be part of the reason some critics have demeaned Neale's lyrics as "doggerel".)

In the music the two-syllable rhymes in lines 2, 4, and 6 (e.g. "Stephen/even", "cruel/fuel") are set to two half-notes (British "minims"), but the final rhyme of each stanza (line 8) is spread over two full measures, the first syllable as two half-notes and the second as a whole note ("semi-breve")—so "fuel" is set as "fu-" with two half-notes and "-el" with a whole-note. Thus, unusually, the final musical line differs from all the others in having not two but three measures of 4/4 time.

Some academics are critical of Neale's textual substitution. H. J. L. J. Massé wrote in 1921:

Why, for instance, do we tolerate such impositions as "Good King Wenceslas?" The original was and is an Easter Hymn...it is marked in carol books as "traditional", a delightful word which often conceals ignorance. There is nothing traditional in it as a carol.

A similar sentiment is expressed by the editors (Percy Dearmer, Martin Shaw and Ralph Vaughan Williams) in the 1928 Oxford Book of Carols, which is even more critical of Neale's carol:

This rather confused narrative owes its popularity to the delightful tune, which is that of a Spring carol. . . . Unfortunately Neale in 1853 substituted for the Spring carol this Good King Wenceslas, one of his less happy pieces, which E. Duncan goes so far as to call "doggerel", and Bullen condemns as "poor and commonplace to the last degree". The time has not yet come for a comprehensive book to discard it; but we reprint the tune in its proper setting . . . not without hope that, with the present wealth of carols for Christmas, Good King Wenceslas may gradually pass into disuse, and the tune be restored to spring-time.

Elizabeth Poston, in the Penguin Book of Christmas Carols, refers to the song as the "product of an unnatural marriage between Victorian whimsy and the thirteenth-century dance carol". She goes on to say that Neale's "ponderous moral doggerel" does not fit the lighthearted dance measure of the original tune, and that if performed in the correct manner it "sounds ridiculous to pseudo-religious words". A similar development has occurred with the song "O Christmas Tree," the tune of which has been used for "Maryland, My Maryland," "The Red Flag," and other unrelated songs.

By contrast, Brian Scott, quoting from The Oxford Book of Carols its criticism and hope that the carol would "pass into disuse", argues: "Thankfully, they were wrong", for the carol "still reminds us that the giving spirit of Christmas should not happen just on that day. . . ." Jeremy Summerly Nicolas Bell of the British Museum also strongly rebuts Dearmer's 20th century criticism, noting: "it could have been awful, but it isn't, it's magical . . . you remember it because the verse just works".

Textual comparison

Other versions
 William Lloyd Webber included Good King Wenceslas as one of his Songs without Words.
 Bing Crosby first covered the song on his 1949 album Christmas Greetings and later covered it another time with Ella Fitzgerald.
 The Beatles' 1963 Christmas Record featured several renditions of the carol.
  In 1984, Mannheim Steamroller recorded an electronic synthesizer arrangement of the carol for their first Christmas album.
  The song's tune was re-worked by the Trans-Siberian Orchestra on their track "Christmas Jazz", from their 2004 CD The Lost Christmas Eve.
 It was covered by English folk duo Blackmore's Night on their 2006 album Winter Carols.
 It was covered by Canadian Celtic singer Loreena McKennitt on her 1995 EP A Winter Garden: Five Songs for the Season, and reissued on her 2008 album A Midwinter Night's Dream.
  In 2013, The Piano Guys made a piano-cello instrumental cover of this song for A Family Christmas, their Christmas studio album.
 Mel Tormé covered the song on his 1992 Christmas Songs album.
 The Count Basie Orchestra recorded a Sammy Nestico Big Band Arrangement of the song, re-named to 'Good Swing Venceslas', on their 2015 Album 'A Very Swingin' Basie Christmas'.
 Child Bite covered the song in their 2018 anthology Burnt Offerings.
 Tenth Avenue North opened their 2017 Christmas album, Decade The Halls, with the song, setting it to 1920s era music.
 Rob Halford, vocalist of metal band Judas Priest, covered the song on his 2019 Christmas album, Celestial.
 The song is included on We Three Kings (The Roches album), the sixth studio album by the folk trio The Roches, released in 1990 on MCA Records.
 The song is included in Relient K's Christmas Album Let It Snow, Baby... Let It Reindeer under the title, "Good King Wenceslas"

In popular culture
 Walt Kelly's Pogo cartoon strip spoofs the song as "Good King Sauerkraut" and "Good King Winkelhoff".
In the film Love Actually, Prime Minister David (Hugh Grant) sings the carol at the home of three small girls to explain his presence there while he is knocking on doors randomly searching for his love interest.
In the British show Miranda, Penny plays the song on the piano with altered lyrics.
In the Scottish film Filth, Dr Rossi sings the song with altered lyrics.
Two Doctor Who episodes have referenced the song.  In the first episode of the 1975 series "Genesis of the Daleks", the Doctor and his companions Sarah Jane Smith and Harry find themselves in the middle of a minefield on the Dalek home planet Skaro. The Doctor turns to them and says, "Follow me and tread in my footsteps." Sarah Jane looks at Harry and remarks, "Good King Wenceslas." In the 2007 Christmas special entitled "Voyage of the Damned", an alien tour guide on board an alien spaceship replica of the Titanic mistakenly believes that Good King Wenceslas is the current monarch of the United Kingdom while explaining Earth's history.
In the television special A Muppet Family Christmas, Gonzo sings this song.
In the 1987 film Dragnet, LAPD Detective Pep Streebeck closes his eyes and starts singing this song during a high-speed chase when told to "think about Christmas" by his partner, Detective Joe Friday.
In Telltale's story driven videogame ""The Walking Dead: Season Two"" the character Sarita sings the carol in the second episode titled "A House Divided". Sarita talks about the meaning of the song with a young girl named Sarah as they decorate a massive christmas tree in the ski lodge.
In the movie The Muppet Christmas Carol, Bean Bunny sings this song to Scrooge. An instrumental rendition of the song is also played during the opening credits.
In the Discworld book Hogfather, the carol is slightly 'twisted' during a scene when Death, while acting as the Hogfather, encounters a king trying to give a beggar his feast as an act of charity, with Death criticizing the king's actions as simply wanting to be praised on Hogswatch night as he has never shown any concern for the beggar before nor will so in the future, forcing the king out and leaving the beggar with plainer food that is nevertheless more to his liking.
Buford and Baljeet sing this song with altered lyrics in A Phineas and Ferb Family Christmas.
The song is begun by guests of The Simpsons in "White Christmas Blues". Marge, who doesn't like second verses of Christmas carols, remarks this one creeps her out from the beginning and leaves the room to listen to a blender.
In the 1983 movie, A Christmas Story, the song is played by the Salvation Army Band outside of Higbee's Department Store.
In The Polar Express, the song is played briefly in one scene where the Polar Express passes the Herpolsheimer's store and in another scene, where the hobo sings it while playing the hurdy-gurdy.
The setting of Gene Wolfe's novel The Devil in a Forest is based on the second verse of the carol, which is given as the epigraph to the book.
The 1987 BBC radio play Crisp and Even Brightly, by Alick Rowe, is a comedic re-telling of the story in the carol, starring Timothy West as Wenceslas, and featuring a page called Mark and other characters not found in the carol.
On the Will & Grace season 6 episode "All About Christmas Eve", Karen sings the song with both Jack and Will to a bellman at her suite at the Palace Hotel.
On the Big Bang Theory episode "The Santa Simulation", Sheldon sings the song while playing Dungeons & Dragons with Leonard, Howard and Stuart, so that his character in the game can avoid danger. Sheldon insists on singing the entire song, even though he only needs to sing the first verse to complete his task.
In a blooper reel of the fourth season of TV series Game of Thrones, Peter Dinklage (Tyrion Lannister) and Nicolaj Coster-Waldau (Jaime Lannister) start singing and dancing to the carol when entering the throne room during Tyrion's trial.
In an episode of The Colbert Report, Colbert sings the song with Michael Stipe and Mandy Patinkin.
In the Porridge Christmas Special, "No Way Out", Norman Stanley Fletcher and his fellow inmates sing the carol - until they are hushed by Mr. Mackay. In place of "When a poor man came in sight gathering winter fuel" comes: "When a Scotsman came in sight hollerin’...".
Comedian John Finnemore wrote a sketch for his Souvenir Programme based on the carol, in which the poor man criticises King Wenceslas for bringing unnecessary fuel and flesh, and for making his page carry them in the cold weather.
In an episode of Hogan's Heroes, several of the POWs loudly and repeatedly rehearse the song in order to distract the guards from the covert activities of the rest of the team.
At the ironic ending of Frederik Pohl's Science Fiction novel Jem, human colonists on a faraway planet developed the habit of celebrating Christmas by taking off their clothes and engaging in a wild orgy, their copulations accompanied by a chorus of the planet's enslaved indigenous beings singing "Good King Wenceslas", whose Christian significance was long forgotten.
The song was parodied by the British children's television programme, Horrible Histories. In this version, carol singers attempt to give a more historically accurate portrayal of the king, including a line about his murder.
The song is parodied by Peter Schickele (aka P.D.Q. Bach) as Good King Kong, though the melody quickly diverges from the original.

See also
 List of Christmas carols

References

Literature 
 Scott, Brian (2015). But Do You Recall? 25 Days of Christmas Carols and the Stories Behind Them, Anderson,

External links

 Free arrangements for piano and voice from Cantorion. org
 Gumpoldus Mantuanus Episcopus [0967-0985]: Vita Vencezlavi Ducis Bohemiae. 'The Life of King Wenceslas' Latin text by Migne Patrologia Latina, Vol. 135, col. 0919 - 0942C.

Christmas carols
Songs about kings
Piae Cantiones
1853 songs
Wenceslaus I, Duke of Bohemia
Cultural depictions of Czech men
Cultural depictions of kings